Pamela J. Myhra (born 1957) is an American politician and served as a member of the Minnesota House of Representatives during the 87th and 88th legislative sessions. A member of the Republican Party of Minnesota, she represented portions of Dakota and Scott counties in the southern Twin Cities metropolitan area. During her first term representing Minnesota House District 40A; January 4, 2011 to January 7, 2013; Myhra served as a member of the Capital Investment, Education Finance, Education Policy and Tax committees. During her second term representing Minnesota House District 56A; January 8, 2013 to January 5, 2015; Myhra served as the minority lead member on the Early Childhood and Youth Development Policy committee and as a member of the Education Finance and Tax committees.  In her second term she was appointed the minority party House legislative liaison to the Minnesota Early Learning Council and to the Minnesota Youth Council.

Myhra is a certified public accountant with an active license and is a member of the American Institute of Certified Public Accountants and the MN Society of CPAs .

Early life, education, and career
Myhra is a long-term resident of Burnsville where she graduated from Burnsville High School in 1975. After graduating from the University of St. Thomas in Saint Paul, earning her B.A. with honors in Business Administration, she joined the public accounting firm, KPMG. As a certified public accountant, she specialized in banking, insurance, and government until placing her career on hold to have a family and home educate her three children. Active in her community, she has also served as a director of a girls’ club and teacher of numerous parenting classes.

Political career
Myhra is a graduate of the Minnesota Excellence in Public Service Series, a communication, leadership, and management program for female leaders; a fellow of the National Conference of State Legislatures Early Learning program; and a Council of State Governments Early Childhood Development program participant. Myhra received the "Elected Women of Excellence Award" from the National Foundation of Women Legislators in November 2013.

Myhra was first elected to the District 56A of the House in 2010, and was re-elected in 2012. She did not seek re-election in 2014. Myhra ran as a candidate for Lieutenant Governor of Minnesota as the running mate of GOP gubernatorial candidate, Marty Seifert, who ran for the Republican nomination for Governor of Minnesota.  Their ticket was defeated in the Republican Primary on August 12, 2014. Myhra opted to run for Lieutenant Governor, rather than seek re-election to her House seat in 2014. In 2018, Myrha ran for Minnesota State Auditor, but lost to Julie Blaha. In 2020, Myrha ran for her previously held House seat, but lost to Jessica Hanson.

References

External links

 Rep. Myhra Web Page
 Project Votesmart - Rep. Pam Myhra Profile
 Pam Myhra Campaign Web Site
 Savage Pacer

1957 births
21st-century American politicians
21st-century American women politicians
Living people
Republican Party members of the Minnesota House of Representatives
University of St. Thomas (Minnesota) alumni
People from Burnsville, Minnesota
Women state legislators in Minnesota
Candidates in the 2014 United States elections
Candidates in the 2018 United States elections
American accountants
Women accountants